"Cerquita De Mí" (English: "A Little Close To Me") is the debut single by Peruvian singer Patrick Romantik. It was released by Sony Music as Romantik's first single as a main artist after being featured in the 2018 song Mi Suegra by Peruvian singer Maricarmen Marín. In November 2019 a remix version of the song was released featuring Peruvian singer Leslie Shaw.

Background and release
The song was released by Sony Music on February 11, 2019. It received attention for being the debut single by Romantik for himself after writing and producing mayor hits for other artists such as Lindo Pero Bruto by Thalía, Duele El Corazón by Enrique Iglesias, and Mayores by Becky G. For the remix, Sony suggested that Romantik collaborated with a different artist but since he is good friends with Shaw and they are both signed to the same label he asked for her to be the one who he collaborated  with for the remix. This version was released as a mother's day special in Perú.

Music video
The music video was released on the same day as the song. It features Romantik at a party playing beer pong with his friends  and then dancing while flirting with a girl. The Leslie Shaw urban remix music video came out on the same day as the song and it features Romantik and Shaw recording the song in the studio.

Charts

Weekly charts

Year-end charts

References

Peruvian songs
2019 singles
Spanish-language songs
2019 songs
Leslie Shaw songs